The Severed inception is the debut album by death metal band Inevitable End. It was released on March 17, 2009 through Relapse Records

Overview
During the first few days of 2009 Inevitable End released the track listing for their highly anticipated debut album entitled The Severed Inception which includes songs "Persevering Incitement", "Embracing the Origin", and "Collapse in Reverse". They released the songs "The Severed Inception" and "Dreamsight Synopsis" to their Myspace and played three shows in Sweden in support of the release.

Track listing

Personnel
 Andres Gerden – Vocals
 Marcus Bertilsson – Guitar
 Johan Ylenstrand – Bass guitar
 Joakim Malmborg – Drums

References

2008 debut albums
Inevitable End albums